This article shows the rosters of all participating teams at the 2017 FIVB Volleyball Women's Club World Championship in Kobe, Japan.

Pool A

Vakıfbank İstanbul
The following is the roster of the Turkish club Vakıfbank İstanbul in the 2017 FIVB Volleyball Women's Club World Championship.    

 Head coach:  Giovanni Guidetti

Dinamo Moscow
The following is the roster of the Russian club Dinamo Moscow in the 2017 FIVB Volleyball Women's Club World Championship.   

Head coach:  Yury Panchenko

Rexona-Sesc Rio
The following is the roster of the Brazilian club Rexona-Sesc Rio in the 2017 FIVB Volleyball Women's Club World Championship.  

Head coach:  Bernardo Rezende

Hisamitsu Springs
The following is the roster of the Japanese club Hisamitsu Springs Kobe in the 2017 FIVB Volleyball Women's Club World Championship.   
 Head coach:  Shingo Sakai

Pool B

Eczacıbaşı VitrA
The following is the roster of the Turkish club Eczacıbaşı VitrA İstanbul in the 2017 FIVB Volleyball Women's Club World Championship.   

Head coach:  Massimo Barbolini

Voléro Zürich
The following is the roster of the Switzerland's club Voléro Zürich in the 2017 FIVB Volleyball Women's Club World Championship.   

Head coach:  Zoran Terzić

Vôlei Nestlé Osasco
The following is the roster of the Brazilian club Vôlei Nestlé Osasco in the 2017 FIVB Volleyball Women's Club World Championship. 
  
Head coach:  Luizomar de Moura

NEC Red Rockets
The following is the roster of the Japanese club NEC Red Rockets in the 2017 FIVB Volleyball Women's Club World Championship.  
 Head coach:  Yamada Akinori

References

External links

2017 in women's volleyball
C